Cavalo (Portuguese "horse") is the first solo album of singer Rodrigo Amarante, released in September 2013 in Brazil by Som Livre, and in May 2014 around the world by the Easy Sound.

Background and recording 
After the indefinite break of Los Hermanos, in 2007, Amarante began to devote himself to the Orquestra Imperial, and the group Little Joy, who founded together with Fabrizio Moretti and Binki Shapiro. After the release of the first album of the trio in 2008, the band was on tour in Brazil and around the world by 2009. Living in Los Angeles, in a place where he was unknown, Amarante then began to write about this "exile" and to know again his own nature, forming what would become Cavalo. The album was recorded in Los Angeles and Rio de Janeiro in 2012 and contains tracks sung in three different languages: Portuguese, English and French, plus some Japanese verses in the title track. Amarante alone recorded most of the album, which features the participation of former bandmates, as Rodrigo Barba, Fabrizio Moretti and Devendra Banhart.

Critical reception 

The album received generally positive reviews, with Rolling Stone magazine placing the album in sixth place in the best national discs of 2013. In a similar list on the site Tenho Mais Discos que Amigos!, Cavalo came in fourth position. In 2014 the album was elected by the Portuguese newspaper Público the fifth best album of the year.  British magazine MOJO elected as the third best album of the year in the category "World."

Touring and promotion 
Three singles were released for Cavalo: "Manna," "Hourglass" and "Tardei." Video clips were launched via the Internet to all singles.

The Rodrigo Amarante tour began in May 2013 in the United States, even before the release of Cavalo, when Amarante opened the shows of Devendra Banhart. For this leg of the tour, Amarante divided the band with Devendra, formed by Fabrizio Moretti, Todd Dahholff and Josiah Steinbrick, taking turns on the instruments.

In September 2013, already with the record out, Amarante began Cavalo tour in Brazil. With a band formed by Rodrigo Barba (drums), Gabriel Bubu (guitar), Gustavo Benjão (bass) and Lucas Vasconcellos (keyboards,) Amarante played in 8 different cities between September and November, and then even opened some concerts for Devendra Banhart in South America.

With a different band, formed by Todd Dalhoff (bass and keyboards,) Matt Borg (guitar and keyboards) and Matthew Compton (drums) in 2014 Rodrigo toured with around the United States and Europe playing in over 20 different countries. The tour returned to Brazil in November before its closure.

Track listing

Credits 
 Rodrigo Amarante - arrangements, composition, sound engineer, vocals, instrumentation
 Devendra Banhart - choir
 Adam Green - choir
 Josiah Steinbrick - choir
 Kristen Wiig - choir
 Todd Dahlhoff - bass
 Fabrizio Moretti - choir, drums
 Rodrigo Barba - drum
 Joel Virgel - djembe
 Hiromi Konishi - vocals
 Noah Georgeson - synthesizer, engineer, mixing, producer
 JJ Golden - mastering
 Samur Khouja - engineer

References

2013 debut albums
Albums produced by Noah Georgeson